Countess Joanne of Nassau-Siegen (1444 – May 1468), official titles: Gräfin zu Nassau, Vianden und Diez, Frau zu Breda, was a countess from the House of Nassau-Siegen, a cadet branch of the Ottonian Line of the House of Nassau, and through marriage Countess of Waldeck.

Biography
Joanne was born in 1444 as the second daughter of Count John IV of Nassau-Siegen and his wife Lady Mary of Looz-Heinsberg.

Joanne married on 14 October 1464 to Count Philip I of Waldeck (1445 – 1475), the eldest son of Count Wolrad I of Waldeck and Countess Barbara of Wertheim. The parents on both sides are said to have designated their children for each other as early as 1452.

Joanne died already in May 1468.

Issue
From the marriage of Joanne and Philip only one son was born:
 Count Henry VIII (1465 – 1513), succeeded his father or grandfather in 1475 and divided the County of Waldeck with his uncle Philip II in 1507 and founded the older line of Waldeck-Eisenberg. He married in 1492 to Anastasia, daughter of William of Runkel and Isenburg. She died in 1502.

Ancestors

Notes

References

Sources
 
 
 
 
 
 
  (1882). Het vorstenhuis Oranje-Nassau. Van de vroegste tijden tot heden (in Dutch). Leiden: A.W. Sijthoff/Utrecht: J.L. Beijers.

External links
 Nassau. In: Medieval Lands. A prosopography of medieval European noble and royal families, by Charles Cawley.
 Nassau Part 4. In: An Online Gotha, by Paul Theroff.
 Waldeck. In: An Online Gotha, by Paul Theroff.

1444 births
1468 deaths
Joanne of Nassau-Siegen
Joanne of Nassau-Siegen
∞|Joanne of Nassau-Siegen
15th-century German women